Eray Şamdan (born 25 July 1997) is a Turkish karateka competing in the kumite. He won the silver medal in the men's 67 kg event at the 2020 Summer Olympics held in Tokyo, Japan.

In 2018, he took the bronze medal in the Kumite 60 kg event at the Mediterranean Games held in Tarragona, Spain. He won the bronze medal in the Kumite −60 kg event at the 2019 European Karate Championships in Guadalajara, Spain, and the gold medal in the same event at the 2021 European Championships in Poreč, Croatia.

He qualified at the World Olympic Qualification Tournament in Paris, France to represent Turkey at the 2020 Summer Olympics in Tokyo, Japan.

He won the gold medal in the men's 60 kg event at the 2022 Mediterranean Games held in Oran, Algeria. In the final, he defeated Ala Salmi of Algeria.

References

External links 
 
 

1997 births
Living people
Sportspeople from İzmit
Turkish male karateka
Competitors at the 2018 Mediterranean Games
Competitors at the 2022 Mediterranean Games
Mediterranean Games medalists in karate
Mediterranean Games gold medalists for Turkey
Mediterranean Games bronze medalists for Turkey
European Games competitors for Turkey
Karateka at the 2019 European Games
Karateka at the 2020 Summer Olympics
Olympic karateka of Turkey
Olympic medalists in karate
Medalists at the 2020 Summer Olympics
Olympic silver medalists for Turkey
21st-century Turkish people